The Perry Avenue Bridge over the Silvermine River in the Silvermine section of Norwalk, Connecticut was built in 1899.  It was listed on the National Register of Historic Places in 2006.

Its depiction in paintings and photographs by artists of nearby art schools has been repetitive.  It "has come to represent the history and character of the Silvermine region in Fairfield County."

Features include a cut stone ring and rusticated brownstone curbing.

A 1955 flood ripped rocks from its spandrels, making it impassable.

See also
Silvermine River Bridge
Silvermine Avenue Bridge
National Register of Historic Places listings in Fairfield County, Connecticut
List of bridges on the National Register of Historic Places in Connecticut

References

Road bridges on the National Register of Historic Places in Connecticut
Bridges completed in 1899
Buildings and structures in Norwalk, Connecticut
Bridges in Fairfield County, Connecticut
National Register of Historic Places in Fairfield County, Connecticut
1899 establishments in Connecticut
Stone arch bridges in the United States